SS Madiana was a passenger and cargo steam ship designed and built in the Robert Napier and Sons shipyard in Glasgow in 1877 as SS Balmoral Castle. She was sold several times over the next 20 years, being named SS San Augustin between 1882 and 1886, before reverting to Balmoral Castle. She was finally sold to the Quebec S.S. Company, Ltd. in 1893 and was renamed Madiana.

On 16 December 1883 San Augustin caught fire north of La Coruna while on passage from Manila bound for Liverpool. Her crew abandoned ship, but she stayed afloat and was towed to La Coruna for repairs. She returned to service in June 1885.

On the morning of 10 February 1903, the SS Madiana was approaching Bermuda after a voyage from New York City. She hit the reefs around the island and wrecked. The passengers and crew were able to evacuate the ship without any fatalities.

References

Further reading
 Wedemeyer, A.J.D. (1903) On Sapphire Seas, - or cruising in the Tropics. A souvenir of the special cruise of the S.S. Madiana to Bermuda, the West Indies and Demerara, in February and March, nineteen hundred and two. Ernest Hart Printing Co., New York.

External links 

https://www.wrecksite.eu/wreck.aspx?59497
http://www.shipwreckexpo.com/bermudashipwrecksmadiana.htm

1876 ships
Maritime incidents in December 1883
Maritime incidents in 1903
Merchant ships of Spain
Merchant ships of the United Kingdom
Ships built in Govan
Ships built on the River Clyde
Shipwrecks in the Caribbean Sea
Steamships of the United Kingdom